Aloha is the Hawaiian word for love, affection, peace, compassion and mercy, that is commonly used as a simple greeting but has a deeper cultural and spiritual significance to native Hawaiians, for whom the term is used to define a force that holds together existence.

The word is found in all Polynesian languages and always with the same basic meaning of "love, compassion, sympathy, kindness", although the use in Hawaii has a seriousness lacking in the Tahitian and Samoan meanings.  Mary Kawena Pukui wrote that the "first expression" of aloha was between a parent and child.

Lorrin Andrews wrote the first Hawaiian dictionary, called A Dictionary of the Hawaiian Language. In it, he describes aloha as "A word expressing different feelings: love, affection, gratitude, kindness, pity, compassion, grief, the modern common salutation at meeting; parting". Mary Kawena Pukui and Samuel Hoyt Elbert's Hawaiian Dictionary: Hawaiian-English, English-Hawaiian also contains a similar definition. Anthropologist Francis Newton states that "Aloha is a complex and profound sentiment. Such emotions defy definition". Anna Wierzbicka concludes that the term has "no equivalent in English".

The state of Hawaii introduced the Aloha Spirit law in 1986, which mandates that state officials and judges treat the public with Aloha.

Etymology 
Aloha was borrowed from the Hawaiian aloha to English language. The Hawaiian word has evolved from the Proto-Polynesian greeting *qarofa, which also meant "love, pity, or compassion". It is further thought to be evolved from Proto-Oceanic root *qarop(-i) meaning "feel pity, empathy, be sorry for", which in turn descends from Proto-Malayo-Polynesian *harep.

Aloha has numerous cognates in other Polynesian languages, such as talofa in Samoan, ta'alofa in Tuvaluan, and aro'a in Cook Islands Māori. Māori given name Aroha is also descended from the Proto-Polynesian root.

See also 

As-salamu alaykum, a greeting in Arabic that means "Peace be upon you"
Mahalo, a Hawaiian word meaning thanks, gratitude, admiration, praise, esteem, regards, or respects
Kia ora, a Maōri greeting
Mabuhay, a Filipino greeting
Namaste, a customary Hindu greeting
Ohana, a Hawaiian term meaning "family"
Shalom, a Hebrew word meaning peace, harmony, wholeness, completeness, prosperity, welfare and tranquility
Talofa, a Samoan greeting

References

Hawaiiana
Hawaiian words and phrases
Greeting words and phrases
Parting phrases